Yaqub Shah may refer to:
 Yaqub Shah, Bahar
 Yaqub Shah, Tuyserkan